Eccleshall Football Club is a football club based in Eccleshall, Staffordshire, England.

History
The club was established in 1971 with involvement from the staff at Eccleshall Secondary School and was originally named Eccleshall Old Boys. They joined the Mid-Staffordshire League, and in 1973–74 the club won the Division Three Cup and finished second in the division, earning promotion to Division Two. In 1974–75 the club won the Division Two Cup. In 1975 the club adopted its current name. They joined the Staffordshire County League in 1979 and were promoted to the Premier Division in 1980–81. In 1983–84 they won the Premier Division, the Premier Division Cup and the May Bank Cup. At the end of the season they became founder members of the Staffordshire Senior League.

Eccleshall were Staffordshire Senior League champions in 1989–90. In 1994 the league was renamed the Midland League, and in 1999–2000 the club were league runners-up. They went on to win back-to-back league titles in 2001–02 and 2002–03, after which they were promoted to Division Two of the North West Counties League. The club also won the Staffordshire FA Vase in 2002–03. Division Two was renamed Division One in 2008.

Ground
The club initially played at Eccleshall Secondary School, before buying a four-acre site at Pershall in 1981. The new ground opened in 1983 and was named Pershall Park. In the same year a small stand was erected, becoming known as 'the Shed'.

Honours
Midland League
Champions 1989–90 2001–02, 2002–03
Staffordshire County League
Premier Division champions 1983–84
Premier Division Cup winners 1983–84
May Bank Cup winners 1983–84
Mid-Staffordshire League
Division Two Cup winners 1975–76
Division Three Cup winners 1973–74
Staffordshire FA Vase
Winners 2002–03

Records
Best FA Cup performance: First qualifying round, 2010–11
Best FA Vase performance: Second round, 1991–92
Record attendance: 2,011 vs FC United, 5 November 2005 (at Marston Road in Stafford)
At Pershall Park: 475 vs Stoke City, Staffordshire Senior Cup, 16 October 2019

See also
Eccleshall F.C. players
Eccleshall F.C. managers

References

External links

 
Football clubs in England
Football clubs in Staffordshire
Association football clubs established in 1971
1971 establishments in England
Staffordshire County League
Midland Football League (1994)
North West Counties Football League clubs
Eccleshall